Saarburg-Kell is a Verbandsgemeinde ("collective municipality") in the district Trier-Saarburg, in Rhineland-Palatinate, Germany. The seat of the Verbandsgemeinde is in Saarburg. It was formed on 1 January 2019 by the merger of the former Verbandsgemeinden Saarburg and Kell am See.

The Verbandsgemeinde Saarburg-Kell consists of the following Ortsgemeinden ("local municipalities"):

Ayl 
Baldringen 
Fisch 
Freudenburg 
Greimerath 
Heddert 
Hentern 
Irsch 
Kastel-Staadt 
Kell am See
Kirf 
Lampaden 
Mandern 
Mannebach 
Merzkirchen 
Ockfen 
Palzem 
Paschel 
Saarburg
Schillingen 
Schoden 
Schömerich 
Serrig 
Taben-Rodt
Trassem 
Vierherrenborn 
Waldweiler 
Wincheringen
Zerf

Verbandsgemeinde in Rhineland-Palatinate